Semyonovka is a rural locality (a selo) and the administrative center of Semyonovskoye Rural Settlement, Verkhnekhavsky District, Voronezh Oblast, Russia. The population was 352 as of 2010. There are 4 streets.

Geography 
Semyonovka is located 16 km southwest of Verkhnyaya Khava (the district's administrative centre) by road. Plyasovatka is the nearest rural locality.

References 

Rural localities in Verkhnekhavsky District